Granville Richard Swift (December 25, 1870 – May 4, 1949) was a Virginia politician.  He served twice as a Democrat in the Virginia House of Delegates.

References

External links

1870 births
1949 deaths
Democratic Party members of the Virginia House of Delegates